{{Infobox AFL biography
| name = Leah Kaslar
| nickname = Xena Princess Warrior
| image = Leah Kaslar 19.03.17.jpg
| caption = Kaslar playing for Brisbane in March 2017
| birth_date = 
| fullname = Leah Kaslar
| birth_place = Caringbah, New South Wales
| originalteam = Coolangatta Tweed Heads (QWAFL)
| draftpick = No. 31, 2016 AFL Women's draft
| debutdate = Round 1, 2017
| debutteam = 
| debutopponent = 
| debutstadium = Casey Fields
| height = 171 cm
| weight = 
| position = Full back/ruck
| currentclub = 
| guernsey = 
| years1 = 2017–2019
| club1 = 
| games_goals1 = 21 (0)
| years2 = 2020–2021
| club2 = 
| games_goals2 = 15 (3)
| games_goalstotal = 36 (3)
| statsend = the 2021 season
| sooyears1 = 2017
| sooteam1 = The Allies
| soogames_goals1 = 1 (0)
| repstatsend = 
| careerhighlights = AFL Women's
Gold Coast co-captain (2020)
Gold Coast leading goalkicker (2021)
Brisbane Lions captain (2019)
QWAFL
 2016 QWAFL League Best & Fairest
}}Leah Kaslar''' (born 11 September 1985) is an Australian rules footballer who played for and co-captained Brisbane and the Gold Coast in the AFL Women's (AFLW).

Early life
Kaslar was born in 1985 in Caringbah, New South Wales and moved with her family to Cairns, Queensland before her first birthday. She first played football as a teenager in Cairns and moved to the Gold Coast shortly after her 21st birthday where she began playing football for Coolangatta Tweed Heads in the QAFLW. She was equal winner of the Queensland Women's AFL (QWAFL) best and fairest in 2016.

AFLW career

Brisbane
She was announced as one of the Brisbane Lions' "values leaders" to assist captain Emma Zielke alongside Emily Bates, Sabrina Frederick-Traub and Sam Virgo in January 2017. She made her debut in the Lions' inaugural game against  at Casey Fields on 5 February 2017. At the end of the season, she was listed in the 2017 40-player All-Australian squad.

Brisbane signed Kaslar for the 2018 season during the trade period in May 2017. Brisbane signed Kaslar for the 2019 season prior to the 2018 AFL Women's draft. On 12 December 2018, she was elected 2019 team captain by her teammates.

Gold Coast
Following the 2019 season, Kaslar joined the Gold Coast. She was appointed co-captain in January 2020. In June 2021, the Gold Coast announced they are not offering Kaslar a contract for the 2022 season.

References

External links

1985 births
Living people
Sportspeople from Cairns
Australian rules footballers from Sydney
Sportswomen from Queensland
Australian rules footballers from Queensland
Brisbane Lions (AFLW) players
Gold Coast Football Club (AFLW) players